Correlophus belepensis is a species of geckos endemic to New Caledonia. They can reach a snout–vent length of 100 mm (5 inches). They have a similar appearance to their sister taxon Correlophus ciliatus. Part of the reason they are critically endangered is because they are sought after in the illegal pet trade. They only occur in a 8 kilometer (5 mile)  area on the province of Belep; In which they are found on hard lateritic soils covered with closed or paraforestier forest.

References

Correlophus
Geckos of New Caledonia
Endemic fauna of New Caledonia
Reptiles described in 2012
Taxa named by Aaron M. Bauer
Taxa named by Anthony Whitaker
Taxa named by Ross Allen Sadlier
Taxa named by Todd R. Jackman